Alison Schumacher (born 22 November 2002) is a Canadian figure skater who competes in women's singles. She is the 2020 Canadian national silver medallist. She has represented Canada at four ISU Championships, finishing within the top ten at two World Junior Championships (2019, 2020).

Early life 
Alison Schumacher was born in Zhuzhou, China on 22 November 2002. She later moved to Tecumseh, Ontario. She began skating in 2007. At age 5, she went to Riverside Skating Club.

Skating career 
At age 9, Schumacher competed in her first international competition, Skate Detroit, where she finished in fourth place. By age 11, Schumacher was the youngest solo skater at Skate Canada Development Camp.

In the 2017–18 season, she competed in both junior ladies singles and junior pairs with Zachary Daleman. At the 2018 Canadian Championships, she placed fifth in the junior ladies' event and eighth in junior pairs.

2018–19 season 
Schumacher began the season competing on the Junior Grand Prix, finishing ninth at JGP Slovakia, before finishing twelfth at JGP Canada. In November 2018, Schumacher won gold at the Skate Ontario Sectionals, securing a place at the 2019 Canadian Championships as a senior competitor domestically. There, she placed fourth in the short program with a score of 60.10 and finished seventh overall.
 
Canada named Schumacher to its team for the 2019 World Junior Championships, where she finished in tenth place.

2019–20 season 
Given two assignments on the Junior Grand Prix, Schumacher placed eighteenth at JGP France and then seventh at JGP Croatia.  Sent afterward to make her international senior debut on the Challenger series, Schumacher placed eighth at the 2019 CS Warsaw Cup.

A podium contender at the 2020 Canadian Championships, Schumacher placed sixth in the short program after falling on her attempted triple flip-triple toe loop combination.  She placed second in the free skate, rising to the silver medal position overall.  With national champion Emily Bausback lacking the technical minimum scores necessary to compete at the 2020 World Championships, Skate Canada deferred on making ladies' assignments for that event, and assigned Schumacher, Bausback and fourth-place Alicia Pineault to compete at the 2020 Four Continents Championships in Seoul.  She placed fourteenth at Four Continents, finishing ahead of Bausback but four places and nearly 23 points behind Pineault.

Schumacher finished the season at the 2020 World Junior Championships, where she placed ninth, setting new personal bests in both segments and overall.

2020–21 season 
Schumacher was assigned to make her Grand Prix debut at the 2020 Skate Canada International, but the event was cancelled as a result of the coronavirus pandemic.

With Skate Canada holding its domestic competitions virtually, Schumacher placed fifth at the Ontario Sectionals before winning the silver medal at the 2021 Skate Canada Challenge.  These results would have qualified her to the 2021 Canadian Championships, but they were deemed infeasible during the pandemic and cancelled.

Schumacher was named as an alternate to the 2021 World Championships, the two ladies' berths going to Madeline Schizas and Emily Bausback. With Canada's mandatory two-week quarantine for returning athletes, however, no member of the World team was assigned to the 2021 World Team Trophy, and Schumacher was assigned as one of Canada's two ladies' entries, alongside Gabrielle Daleman. Schumacher placed ninth in the short program and eighth in the free skate, while Team Canada finished in sixth place.

2021–22 season 
Schumacher began the season at the 2021 CS Autumn Classic International, where she placed tenth out of eleven competitors and third of the three Canadian women competing at the event. She then made her Grand Prix debut at the 2021 Skate Canada International, finishing twelfth out of twelve skaters. She remarked afterwards, "I'm struggling with nerves and tightness when I feel the pressure." Given a second Challenger assignment, she was thirteenth at the 2021 CS Cup of Austria.

At the 2022 Canadian Championships, Schumacher placed sixth in the short program and ninth in the free skate but finished in fifth place overall. Reflecting on difficulties with some of the jumps in her free skate, she said afterwards, "in the middle, I had to fight, but I am happy. It could have gone worse. Overall, I am happy with the fight." Schumacher was assigned to the 2022 Four Continents Championships in Tallinn, where she came eleventh.

Programs

Competitive highlights 
GP: Grand Prix; CS: Challenger Series; JGP: Junior Grand Prix

Womens' singles

Pairs with Daleman

Detailed results 
Small medals for short and free programs awarded only at ISU Championships.

Senior results

Junior results

References

External links 
 

Canadian female single skaters
2002 births
Living people